The Campeonato Brasiliense Third Division was the third tier of football league of the state of Distrito Federal, Brazil.

List of champions

Titles by team

Teams in bold stills active.

References

 
Brasiliense